The NJPW 50th Anniversary Show was an professional wrestling event promoted by New Japan Pro-Wrestling (NJPW). The event took place on March 1, 2022, in Tokyo, Japan at the Nippon Budokan. The event was to commemorate the fiftieth anniversary of the promotion, which was founded in 1972 by Antonio Inoki.

Production

Background 
On November 15, 2021, NJPW announced that the promotion would hold its fiftieth anniversary show at Nippon Budokan on March 1 of the following year. Kota Ibushi and Hiroyoshi Tenzan were originally scheduled to take part in the event, but both pulled out due to injuries.

NJPW legends Minoru Tanaka, Shiro Koshinaka, Norio Honaga, Tatsumi Fujinami, and Yoshiaki Fujiwara took part in several matches at the event. Along with the aforementioned legends; Wataru Inoue, Jushin Liger, Kuniaki Kobayashi, Seiji Sakaguchi, Tiger Hattori, Motoyuki Kitazawa, Milano Collection A.T., Masahito Kakihara, Kazuo Yamazaki, Akira Maeda, Kengo Kimura, Masahiro Chono, Keiji Mutoh, and Riki Choshu took part of the pre-show with Chono and Choshu also providing Japanese commentary for the event. Former ring announcer Kero Tanaka, was the special guest announcer for the main event.

Storylines 
The NJPW 50th Anniversary Show features professional wrestling matches that involve different wrestlers from pre-existing scripted feuds and storylines. Wrestlers portray villains, heroes, or less distinguishable characters in the scripted events that build tension and culminate in a wrestling match or series of matches.

Results

See also 

 2022 in professional wrestling
 List of major NJPW events

References

External links 

 Official New Japan Pro-Wrestling's website

2022 in professional wrestling
2022 in Tokyo
New Japan Pro-Wrestling shows
Professional wrestling in Tokyo
Professional wrestling anniversary shows